The following lists events that happened during 1970 in Somalia.

Incumbents
President: Siad Barre

Events
In April, Barre created the National Security Courts, judicial bodies which tried his political opponents and public critics
On 10 September, the government enacted National Security Law No. 54, allowing the NSS to punish critics of the regime with indefinite detention without trial
On 21 October, Barre declared Somalia a Socialist state run according to the principles of Scientific socialism, and banned diyya blood money
Nuruddin Farah published From a Crooked Rib

Public holidays

See also

Timeline of Somali history

References

 
Somalia
Years of the 20th century in Somalia
1970s in Somalia
Somalia